Matthew Garrett McCoy (born October 14, 1982) is a former American football linebacker. He was drafted by the Philadelphia Eagles in the second round of the 2005 NFL Draft. He played college football at San Diego State.

McCoy has also played for the New Orleans Saints, Tampa Bay Buccaneers and Seattle Seahawks.

Early years
McCoy attended Tustin High School in Tustin, California.  He set the school record for quarterback sacks with 18.5 sacks as a junior. As a senior, he broke his own record with 23 sacks and was named "High School Defensive Player of the Year" by the Orange County Register.

College career
McCoy played college football at San Diego State University where he won All-Mountain West Conference honors.  He finished his career with eight sacks, 270 tackles (26.5 for losses), four forced fumbles, three fumble recoveries, four pass deflections, and a blocked kick.

Professional career

Philadelphia Eagles
McCoy was drafted by the Philadelphia Eagles in the second round of the 2005 NFL Draft as a project linebacker whom Eagles personnel felt they could develop. McCoy was expected to contribute to special teams, but did not contribute in his rookie season. Going into 2006, he was named the weakside linebacker starter by Defensive Coordinator Jim Johnson. Initially he had been praised as having great speed, sideline to sideline pursuit abilities and a high motor, as well as described as a "ball hawk". He had an injured shoulder later in the year that prevented him from playing as well as he had during the first 6 weeks of the season, and ultimately led to his benching in favor of rookie Omar Gaither. Matt McCoy finished the season with 66 tackles, 2 sacks, 3 forces fumbles, and 5 tackles for loss.

At the beginning of the 2007 season, McCoy was listed as a back-up linebacker and a starter on special team kickoffs. In the team's Week 8 game against the Minnesota Vikings, McCoy was flagged for unnecessary roughness after a late hit on punter Chris Kluwe. The following day, he was cut in favor of practice squad linebacker Akeem Jordan. When asked about the penalty's effect on the transaction, head coach Andy Reid said Jordan was more the reason for the move.

New Orleans Saints
After being let go by the Eagles, McCoy was signed by the New Orleans Saints on November 3, 2007. He appeared in four games with the team, recording two solo tackles.

McCoy was not tendered a contract by the team as a restricted free agent the following off-season, making him an unrestricted free agent.

Tampa Bay Buccaneers
On March 4, 2008, McCoy signed with the Tampa Bay Buccaneers.

After being inactive for the 2009 regular season opener, McCoy recorded one tackle against the Buffalo Bills on September 20. He was released by the Buccaneers on September 26 when wide receiver Mario Urrutia was promoted from the practice squad. He was re-signed on September 29, when Urrutia was waived. McCoy was released again on October 13, to make room for newly signed wide receiver Yamon Figurs. He was re-signed on November 11.

Seattle Seahawks
On March 16, 2010, McCoy signed with the Seattle Seahawks.

References

External links
Seattle Seahawks bio

1982 births
Living people
American football linebackers
New Orleans Saints players
People from Tustin, California
Philadelphia Eagles players
Players of American football from California
San Diego State Aztecs football players
Seattle Seahawks players
Sportspeople from Orange County, California
Tampa Bay Buccaneers players